Ruy Arianto (born 7 July 2004) is an Indonesian professional footballer who plays as a winger for Liga 1 club Persebaya Surabaya.

Club career

Persebaya Surabaya
He was signed for Persebaya Surabaya to play in Liga 1 in the 2021 season. Ruy made his first-team debut on 6 February 2022 in a match against Persipura Jayapura at the Ngurah Rai Stadium, Denpasar.

Career statistics

Club

Notes

Honours

International 
Indonesia U-16
 AFF U-16 Youth Championship third place: 2019

References

External links
 Ruy Arianto at Soccerway
 Ruy Arianto at Liga Indonesia

2004 births
Living people
Indonesian footballers
Persebaya Surabaya players
Association football midfielders
Sportspeople from Surabaya
21st-century Indonesian people